A toxidrome (a portmanteau of toxic and syndrome) is a syndrome caused by a dangerous level of toxins in the body. The term was coined in 1970 by Mofenson and Greensher. It is often the consequence of a drug overdose.  Common symptoms include dizziness, disorientation, nausea, vomiting, and oscillopsia.  A toxidrome may indicate a medical emergency requiring treatment at a poison control center.  Aside from poisoning, a systemic infection may also lead to a toxidrome. "Classic" toxidromes are presented below, but they are often variable or obscured by the co-ingestion of multiple drugs.

Anticholinergic

The symptoms of an anticholinergic toxidrome include blurred vision, coma, decreased bowel sounds, delirium, dry skin, fever, flushing, hallucinations, ileus, memory loss, mydriasis (dilated pupils), myoclonus, psychosis, seizures, and urinary retention.  Complications include hypertension, hyperthermia, and tachycardia.  Substances that may cause this toxidrome include  antihistamines, antipsychotics, antidepressants, antiparkinsonian drugs, atropine, benztropine, datura, and scopolamine.

Cholinergic

The symptoms of a cholinergic toxidrome include bronchorrhea, confusion, defecation, diaphoresis, diarrhea, emesis, lacrimation, miosis, muscle fasciculations, salivation, seizures, urination, and weakness.  Complications include bradycardia, hypothermia, and tachypnea.  Substances that may cause this toxidrome include carbamates, mushrooms, and organophosphates.

Hallucinogenic
The symptoms of a hallucinogenic toxidrome include disorientation, hallucinations, hyperactive bowel sounds, panic, and seizures.  Complications include hypertension, tachycardia, and tachypnea.  Substances that may cause this toxidrome include substituted amphetamines, cocaine, and phencyclidine.

Opiate

The symptoms of an opiate toxidrome include the classic triad of coma, pinpoint pupils, and respiratory depression as well as altered mental states, shock, pulmonary edema and unresponsiveness.  Complications include bradycardia, hypotension, and hypothermia.  Substances that may cause this toxidrome are opioids.

Sedative/hypnotic
The symptoms of sedative/hypnotic toxidrome include ataxia, blurred vision, coma, confusion, delirium, deterioration of central nervous system functions, diplopia, dysesthesias, hallucinations, nystagmus, paresthesias, sedation, slurred speech, and stupor.  Apnea is a potential complication.  Substances that may cause this toxidrome include anticonvulsants, barbiturates, benzodiazepines, gamma-Hydroxybutyric acid, Methaqualone, and ethanol. While most sedative-hypnotics are anticonvulsant, some such as GHB and methaqualone instead lower the seizure threshold, and so can cause paradoxical seizures in overdose.

Sympathomimetic

The symptoms of a sympathomimetic toxidrome include anxiety, delusions, diaphoresis, hyperreflexia, mydriasis, paranoia, piloerection, and seizures.  Complications include hypertension, and tachycardia.  Substances that may cause this toxidrome include cocaine, amphetamine, and compounds based upon amphetamine's structure such as ephedrine (Ma Huang), methamphetamine, phenylpropanolamine (PPA), and pseudoephedrine. The bronchodilator salbutamol may also cause this toxidrome. It may appear very similar to the anticholinergic toxidrome, but is distinguished by hyperactive bowel sounds and sweating.

References

Further reading

Medical emergencies
Medical terminology
Toxicology
Substance intoxication
Medical mnemonics